A Prominent Patient is a 2016 Czech-Slovak biographical drama film directed by Julius Ševčík. It was screened in the Berlinale Special section at the 67th Berlin International Film Festival. It won twelve Czech Lions including the Czech Lion for Best Film. The film was first screened in Lucerna Kino.

Plot
The film is set in the years 1937-1939. It shows the life of Jan Masaryk when he was the Czechoslovak ambassador to the United Kingdom. The film starts with the death of the first Czechoslovak president and Jan's father Tomáš Garrigue Masaryk. Jan becomes Ambassador to the United Kingdom. Czechoslovakia faces aggression from Nazi Germany, which supports the Sudeten Germans. Masaryk tries to persuade the United Kingdom to help his homeland but the Munich Agreement is eventually settled and Czechoslovakia is forced to give up its borderlands to Germany. Jan Masaryk is devastated and leaves to the United States. He ends up in a sanatorium due to his psychological problems. He is treated by Doctor Stein. Their relationship is problematic because Stein is German. Masaryk is also helped by an American journalist, Marcia Davenport.

Cast
 Karel Roden as Jan Masaryk
 Hanns Zischler as Dr. Stein
 Oldřich Kaiser as Edvard Beneš
 Arly Jover as Marcia Davenport
 Jiří Vyorálek as Konrad Henlein
 Emília Vášáryová as Blaženka
 Eva Herzigová as Madla
 Martin Hofmann as the President's Secretary
 Zuzana Kronerová as Alice Masaryková
 Jiří Ornest as Tomáš Garrigue Masaryk
 Ján Greššo as Milan Hodža
 Dermot Crowley as Lord Halifax
 Paul Nicholas as Neville Chamberlain
 Gina Bramhill as Lady Annie Higgins
 Stewart Moss as the bodyguard
 Joan Blackham as Mrs. Fitzgerald

Production
Shooting consisted of two parts. In fall 2015, filming started in Slovakia and then moved to the Czech Republic in January 2016. Some scenes were also shot in the Netherlands. Shooting took 40 days overall. Scenes set in London were shot in Prague. There is a shot of the British parliament that was modeled from Czech realms by work of compositioners.

Reception

Critical reception
A Prominent Patient has received generally mixed to positive reviews from critics. It holds 68% at Kinobox aggregator. The film won twelve Czech Lion Awards and eight Sun in a Net Awards. Masaryk's participation in the Sun in a Net Awards received attention due to its success at Czech Lions.
 The film received lukewarm reviews from critics at the Berlin International Film Festival. Critics criticised cheap sex scenes, aggravation of the film and confusing plot. They also criticised some supporting actors.

Accolades

References

External links
 

2016 films
2016 drama films
2016 biographical drama films
2010s historical drama films
2010s Czech-language films
Slovak-language films
English-language Czech films
Czech historical drama films
Czech biographical drama films
Czech Lion Awards winners (films)
Sun in a Net Awards winners (films)
Czech Television original films
Films scored by Michał Lorenc
Slovak historical drama films
Czech World War II films
Slovak World War II films
2016 multilingual films
Czech multilingual films
Slovak multilingual films
English-language Slovak films